Brethren in Christ Church is a historic Brethren church located near Garrett in Keyser Township, DeKalb County, Indiana.  It was built in 1882, and is a Gothic Revival-style brick building.  It consists of a -story min block with a two-story central bell tower.  The tower features an oculus window and bellcast hipped roof.

It was added to the National Register of Historic Places in 1983.

References

Churches in DeKalb County, Indiana
Churches on the National Register of Historic Places in Indiana
Gothic Revival church buildings in Indiana
Churches completed in 1882
National Register of Historic Places in DeKalb County, Indiana